List of active ships of the Turkish Naval Forces
 List of submarines of the Turkish Navy
 List of major surface ships of the Turkish Navy
 List of patrol vessels of the Turkish Navy
 List of amphibious warfare vessels of the Turkish Navy
 List of mine warfare vessels of the Turkish Navy
 List of miscellaneous ships of the Turkish Navy